Richard Boateng may refer to:

Richard Kissi Boateng (born 1988), Ghanaian football left back
Richard Boateng (footballer, born 1992), Ghanaian football midfielder